Somatidia pinguis is a species of beetle in the family Cerambycidae. It was described by the entomologist Thomas Broun in 1913.

References

pinguis
Beetles described in 1913